This is a list of seasons completed by the Los Angeles Angels, also known as the California Angels from 1965 to 1996, the Anaheim Angels from 1997 to 2004, and the Los Angeles Angels of Anaheim from 2005 to 2015. They are a professional baseball franchise based in Anaheim, California. They play in the Western Division of Major League Baseball's (MLB) American League.

Established in 1961, the Angels played their first four seasons in the city of Los Angeles, California under two stadiums: Wrigley Field, the venue used for the Pacific Coast League team that the Angels named themselves after, and Dodger Stadium, which the Angels referred to as "Chavez Ravine". They moved to the city of Anaheim in 1966 while changing the name of the team to refer to the entire state of California while playing in Anaheim Stadium, where they play today (which is now called Angel Stadium). The Angels were created in 1960 as part of a boom in baseball coming to the state of California. They were the third California MLB team to play in the state but the first non-relocated team to play there. Gene Autry was the first owner of the franchise, having bought the rights in 1960. The inaugural season for the team resulted in seventy wins to 91 losses, which stands as the best winning percentage for an expansion MLB team. They would contend in parts of the 1960s, finishing 3rd twice in the decade but never finishing closer than ten games out of a pennant. The 1970s brought a number of miserable seasons, which included seven straight losing seasons from 1971 to 1977. However, the Angels had a few shining spots in that era, which included Nolan Ryan (who threw four no-hitters with the team). In 1979, the Angels won the AL West and thus reached the postseason for the first time ever. They lost to the Baltimore Orioles in four games, while Ryan departed Anaheim in free agency. The Angels won the AL West twice in the next decade but fell short of the World Series by one game each time. 

In 1997, The Walt Disney Company bought ownership in the team. As such, the team name was changed to reflect the actual city the team played in while renovations were done for the stadium, which took corporate branding that referred to it as "Edison International Field of Anaheim", which stayed that way until 2003. Losing a one-game tiebreaker for the AL West in 1995 was the closest the Angels were to reaching the postseason in the 1990s. However, the Angels steadily grew talent in the next few years that soon made them a relative contender, done under manager Mike Scioscia. In 2002, the Angels went from losing 87 games to winning 99 to set a franchise record for wins at the time while making the postseason for the first time in sixteen years. They would roll to a World Series victory during the postseason, which included winning the final two games while facing elimination. In the next twelve seasons, the Angels would reach the postseason six times. Despite seeing two players awarded Most Valuable Player (2016, 2019, 2021) over the next couple of years, the Angels have failed to reach the postseason since 2014 and have had seven straight losing seasons (2016-present), tied for the most in franchise history.

The Angels in total have completed 61 seasons in Major League Baseball, qualifying for the postseason ten times with one World Series championship (2002). The Angels are one of only two teams (the other being the Colorado Rockies) to never lose 100 games in a season.

Table key

Year by year

Record by decade 
The following table describes the Angels' MLB win–loss record by decade.

These statistics are from Baseball-Reference.com's Los Angeles Angels of Anaheim History & Encyclopedia,.

Postseason record by year
The Angels have made the postseason ten times in their history, with their first being in 1979 and the most recent being in 2014.

Notes
This is determined by calculating the difference in wins plus the difference in losses divided by two.
For lists of all American League pennant winners, see American League pennant winners 1901–68 and American League Championship Series.
Half-game increments are possible because games can be cancelled due to rain. If a postponed game is the last of the season between two teams in one of their stadiums, it may not be made up if it does not affect the playoff race.
In 1969, the American League split into East and West divisions.
The 1972 Major League Baseball strike forced the cancellation of the Angels' first seven games of the season.
The 1981 Major League Baseball strike caused the season to be split into two halves.
The 1994–95 Major League Baseball strike, which started on August 12, led to the cancellation of the playoffs and World Series. As a result of the abbreviated season, MLB did not officially award division championships.
The 1994 MLB strike lasted until April 2, 1995, causing the shortening of the 1995 season to 144 games.

References

External links
 Angels Year-By-Year Results at MLB.com
 Angels Postseason Results at MLB.com

Seasons
Los Angeles Angels
Los Angeles Angels seasons